Sir William Essex (1477–1548) was an English politician.

William Essex may also refer to:

William Essex (fl. 1406), MP for Wallingford
Sir William Essex, 1st Baronet (c. 1575-c. 1645), English politician
William Essex (painter) (1784–1869), miniaturist
William Leopold Essex (1886–1936), bishop of the Episcopal Diocese of Quincy

See also